is the twelfth single by Japanese recording artist Aya Ueto. It was released on August 3, 2005 as the second single from Ueto's fourth studio album License. "Kaze o Ukete" served as theme song for the animation film Konjiki no Gash Bell!! Movie 2: Attack of the Mecha-Vulcan.

Overview 

The title track and the B-side, "Yakusoku no Basho," were written and produced by Ryoji from Ketsumeishi. The collaboration came about as Ueto's record label was looking for new songs Ueto could record for her next album. Being a big fan of Ketsumeishi, her team offered Ryoji to produce a few songs for her, which he readily accepted. Ryoji also remixed Ueto's "Yume no Chikara" for the single, which features a verse by Ryoji himself.

Ueto commented on the collaboration, "When I received the demo, I couldn't believe it. I was touched to tears." "I did my very best," she added, explaining that during the recording, Ryoji advised her to not worry about being pitch-perfect and to just have fun with the song.

Chart performance 
"Kaze o Ukete" debuted on the Oricon Daily Singles chart at number 15 on August 2, 2005 and climbed to number 12 the following day. It peaked at number 17 on the Oricon Weekly Singles chart, with 13,938 copies sold in its first week. The single charted for six weeks and has sold a total of 12,888 copies.

Track listing

Charts

Release history

References

External links 

2005 singles
Aya Ueto songs
Japanese film songs
Songs written for animated films